Beta-D-fucosidase (beta-fucosidase) is an enzyme with systematic name beta-D-fucoside fucohydrolase. This enzyme catalyses the following chemical reaction

 Hydrolysis of terminal non-reducing beta-D-fucose residues in beta-D-fucosides

Enzymes from some sources also hydrolyse beta-D-galactosides, beta-D-glucosides and alpha-L-arabinosides.

References

External links 

EC 3.2.1